Swami Vivekananda Road, commonly referred to by the abbreviation SV Road, is a station on the Purple Line of the Namma Metro in Bangalore, India.

Station layout

Entry/Exits

See also
Swami Vivekananda
List of Namma Metro stations
Transport in Karnataka
List of metro systems
List of rapid transit systems in India
Bangalore Metropolitan Transport Corporation

References

External links

 Bangalore Metro Rail Corporation Ltd. (Official site) 
 UrbanRail.Net – descriptions of all metro systems in the world, each with a schematic map showing all stations.

Namma Metro stations
Railway stations in India opened in 2011
2011 establishments in Karnataka
Railway stations in Bangalore